Mount Maunganui, or Mauao, commonly known by locals as The Mount, is a dormant volcanic cone at the end of a peninsula in the town of Mount Maunganui, by the eastern entrance to the Tauranga Harbour in New Zealand. It is considered very important and tapu (sacred) by the local Māori iwi, featuring extensively in local mythology. It is also of significant historical value. The summit is 232 metres above sea level.

In recent years there have been several fires on the mountain, in turn triggering a number of replanting efforts. Since Mount Maunganui has been open to the general public it has become a popular location for many activities including scenic walks, jogging and even hang gliding.

Maori legend

In the ancient times of the Maori people there lived a nameless hill. He sat alone in a discarded inland area and was slave to Otanewainuku, the most prestigious mountain of Tauranga Moana. Nearby there lived a captivating hill whose name was Puwhenua; she was adorned with the beauty of Tanemahuta (God of the Forest). The nameless one desired the affection of Puwhenua, but her heart had already been won by Otanewainuku. This resulted in disparity which led the nameless one to decide to take his life by drowning in Te Moananui-a-Kiwa (Pacific Ocean). So he called upon his companions the patupaiarehe (fairy people) who dwelt in the dark recesses of the forest. The patupaiarehe were people of the night and possessed magical powers. The nameless one knew that with their help his ambition to end his life will be accomplished. When night fell, they laced the nameless one with dozens of ropes and began to heave and pull. The land rumbled as the patupaiarehe forced the nameless one from his position. A valley was gouged as they heaved him along, which is where the Waimapu river now flows. They continued along the Tauranga Moana channels where Hairini, Maungatapu and Matapihi reside. Upon their arrival near the great ocean of Kiwa, daybreak was fast approaching. Unfortunately for the nameless one this was proving to be quite a complex and problematic task. The rays of Tama nui te ra (Sun) began to light up the summit of the nameless hill and before they knew it, the patupaiarehe were exposed to the rays of light, so they retreated back to the depths of the forests.

The patupaiarehe decided to give the name Mauao to this mountain, which now marks the entrance into Tauranga Harbour. The literal translation of Mauao is "caught by the dawn". In time this mountain assumed its own great prestige and mana even over his once rival Otanewainuku and now stands as the symbol of all tribes of Tauranga Moana.

Early history of Tauranga and Mauao 

The name Tauranga can be translated as meaning 'place of rest' or 'anchorage'. 
The earliest people known to have resided in the Tauranga area are the Purukupenga, whose name alone survives, and the Ngamarama, who inhabited all the land from the Waimapu Stream to the Kaimai Ranges.

Many people of different waka passed through and some stayed. This included those of the Tainui canoe, which made only a brief stay, although evidence of their visit can be linked to “nga pehi o Tainui”, the ballast of Tainui, now known as Ratahi Rock.

Another was the Te Arawa canoe which made landfall at Maketu, with some of her crew occupying the land between the Tauranga harbour and the Kaituna River. After the departure of Tainui the Takitimu canoe then entered the Tauranga harbour.  Its captain, Tamatea Arikinui, climbed to the summit of Mauao (Mount Maunganui) to offer karakia (prayers) and to bury there the mauri (life force) of his people.

Tamatea built a pa (stockaded village) on the hill known as Maungatawa, where his people settled.  Ngati Ranginui all descended from Tamatea’s grandson, Ranginui. In later years Ngaiterangi after many failed attempts of looking to settle themselves in a permanent area led a massive raid on the Ngati Ranginui pa site on top of Mauao (around 1700). This attack resulted in the pa falling to Ngaiterangi, and is known as the 'Battle of the Kokowai'.

According to archaeologist there has been evidence of three pa sites recorded on top of and around Mauao. The final encounter of warfare ended at the cliffs of Mauao between Ngaiterangi and Ngapuhi. Armed with muskets Ngapuhi decided to intimidate and force their way through under the command of Te Morenga in 1820, the large pa site was not re-occupied after this battle. A peace was made with Ngapuhi shortly afterwards by Te Waru of Ngaiterangi.

MV Ranui
At about 5pm on 28 December 1950, 23 people were drowned (3 crew and 20 passengers) when the 6 ton 45 foot passenger launch Ranui was driven on to North West Rock at the base of the mountain by an exceptionally high wave. The launch was capsized and was smashed to pieces. The only survivor was a 19-year-old youth, Phillip "Bluey" Smith. A Marine Court found no fault with the boat's master or owners.

The vessel's engine was wedged between rocks on the seaward edge of the base track above North West Rock. A brass plaque was installed in memory of those who died.

Ownership
On 14 May 2008, New Zealand's Parliament adopted legislation whereby ownership of Mount Maunganui was transferred from the Crown to the Ngāi Te Rangi, Ngati Ranginui and Ngati Pukenga iwi. The land had been alienated following the 1863 land wars.

See also
 List of volcanoes in New Zealand
 Mount Maunganui

References

 Preliminary Archaeological Survey, Ken Phillips (2003)
 Tauranga Mythology: The Story of Mauao
 Tauranga City: Mauao, archaeological perspective
 Tauranga City: Legend of the naming of Mauao
 http://library.tauranga.govt.nz
 http://www.teara.govt.nz/NewZealanders/MaoriNewZealanders/TaurangaMoanaTribes/1/en

External links

 Mount Maunganui Tourism Website
 Evelyn Stokes (1980) Stories of Tauranga Moana: Mauao
 Evelyn Stokes (1990) Te Raupatu o Tauranga Moana (The confiscations of Tauranga land)
Maunganui
Maunganui
Maunganui
Maunganui
Maunganui
Tauranga